Ampullarioidea  is a taxonomic superfamily of freshwater snails, aquatic gastropod mollusks within the informal group Architaenioglossa, which belongs to the clade Caenogastropoda (unassigned).

Families
 Ampullariidae Gray, 1824
 † Naricopsinidae Gründel, 2001
Family brought into synonymy
 Pilidae Preston, 1915: synonym of  Ampullariidae Gray, 1824

References

Architaenioglossa
Taxa named by John Edward Gray